Count of Abrantes (in Portuguese Conde de Abrantes) was a Portuguese title of nobility created by a royal decree, dated from June 13, 1476, by King Afonso V of Portugal, and granted to his 4th cousin, Lopo de Almeida.

Dom Lopo was closely related to the Portuguese royal House, once his great-grandfather was Infante João, Duke of Valencia de Campos (son of King Peter I of Portugal and of Inês de Castro).

This title became extinct when the 4th Count, Miguel de Almeida, a hero of the Portuguese uprising of December 1, 1640, died without issue in 1650.

Genealogical summary

List of the Counts of Abrantes (1476)
Lopo de Almeida (1416–1486), 1st Count of Abrantes
João de Almeida (1445–1512), 2nd Count of Abrantes (son of the previous)
Lopo de Almeida (1470- ? ), 3rd Count of Abrantes (son of the previous)
Miguel de Almeida (1575–1650), 4th Count of Abrantes (2nd cousin of the previous)

Family Name

The family name associated with the Counts of Abrantes was Almeida.

The Almeida clan was closely associated with King John II of Portugal played a pivotal role in the 1490s succession crisis, strongly backing John II's preferred candidate, Jorge de Lencastre against the eventual winner, Manuel, Duke of Beja.

According to Subrahmanyam (1997: 49), Lopo de Almeida, the first Count of Abrantes, had at least six notable sons:

D. João de Almeida - 2nd Count of Abrantes married D. Inês de Noronha (a niece of Christopher Columbus)
D. Diogo Fernandes de Almeida - tutor of Jorge de Lencastre and, from 1492, Prior of Crato (Portuguese branch of St. John Hospitaller).
D. Jorge de Almeida, Bishop of Coimbra from mid-1490s.
D. Pedro da Silva - used his mother's surname, sent on king's 1494 mission to Pope Alexander VI.
D. Fernando de Almeida - sent with Pedro on the papal mission.
D. Francisco de Almeida - commander of 1505 expedition to India, first Vice-roy of Portuguese India.

The Almeida clan remained the principal political opponents of Manuel I of Portugal throughout his reign.

See also
List of Countships in Portugal

Bibliography
"Nobreza de Portugal e do Brasil" – Vol. II, pages 203/205. Zairol Lda., Lisboa 1989.
 Subrahmanyam, S. (1997) The Career and Legend of Vasco da Gama. Cambridge, UK: Cambridge University Press.

External links
Genealogy of the Count of Abrantes (in Portuguese)

Abrantes
1476 establishments in Portugal